Starwave Records (formerly Darkest Labyrinth and Cure) is a Tokyo based record label, distributor, and web store specializing in gothic and visual kei artists in genres such as Electro-industrial, darkwave, gothic rock, EBM, and industrial metal.

First called Cure, Starwave Records started as an Osaka-based project to release works by label-owner Kiwamu's own band BLOOD. The label changed names to Darkest Labyrinth and expanded to distribute music by international Gothic and Post-Industrial artists in Japan. In 2007 the label started to sign other artists, making its first deals with international groups such as Virgins O.R. Pigeons (Greece), Spectrum-X (Italy) and GPKism (Australia). That same year they released their first compilation record "V.A. - Darkest Labyrinth" featuring tracks from Japan's dark underground music scene.

Darkest Labyrinth reached its heyday in 2009, releasing works by a variety of international and Japanese artists. As of March 2009 Darkest Labyrinth had released 50 titles from the label and distributed 280 titles from other labels for Japanese major distribution.

In 2010, the web store rebranded itself as Starwave Records and opened a new facebook account.

The most successful artist on the label was BLOOD who had sold over 20 000 CDs.

Roster 
 BLOOD
 GPKism
 Spectrum-X
 Noir du'Soleil
 SUICIDE ALI
 2 Bullet
 Rose Noire
 Labaiser
 Seileen
 Marlee
 Takuya Angel
 Angelspit

Note: some artists are only signed to Darkest Labyrinth for Japanese releases, while they are signed to other labels for Europe, North America, etc.

Labels distributed 

 Alfa Matrix
 Aural Music
 Deadscarlet Records
 Decadance records
 Sound Base Music
 Thorntree Records
 Subsound Records
 Urgence Disk
 HTD Records

See also 
 List of record labels
 List of electronic music record labels

External links 
 Official Site

Notes

Japanese independent record labels
Electronic music record labels
Industrial record labels
Goth record labels
Record labels established in 2000